Girardot is a French surname. Notable people with the surname include:

Ana Girardot (born 1988), French stage, film and television actress
Annie Girardot (1931–2011), French actress
Atanasio Girardot (1791–1813), Colombian revolutionary leader
Etienne Girardot (1856–1939), Anglo-French actor
Hippolyte Girardot (born 1955), French actor
Léonce Girardot (1864–1922), French motorist and motor manufacturer
Maurice Girardot (1921–2016), French basketball player

French-language surnames